Edil is a given name meaning "Great power and ruler to all".  
The name appears both in Nordic and Islamic cultures. In Islam, it is a variant of the more prominent name Adeel.
Notable people with the name include:

 Edil Baisalov (born 1977), Kyrgyz politician and activist
 Edil Rosenqvist (1892–1973), Finnish wrestler